The 1983–84 West Virginia Mountaineers men's basketball team represented West Virginia University as a member of the Atlantic-10 Conference during the 1983-84 season. The team played their home games at WVU Coliseum in Morgantown, West Virginia. Led by 6th-year head coach Gale Catlett, the Mountaineers won the conference tournament and received an automatic bid to the 1984 NCAA Tournament as No. 11 seed in the Mideast region. In the opening round, West Virginia knocked off No. 6 seed Oregon State. The season came to an abrupt end in the round of 32 with a 102–77 loss to No. 3 seed Maryland.

Roster

Schedule and results

|-
!colspan=9 style=| Regular Season

|-
!colspan=9 style=| Atlantic-10 Tournament

|-
!colspan=9 style=| NCAA Tournament

References

West Virginia
West Virginia Mountaineers men's basketball seasons
West Virginia Mountaineers men's basketball
West Virginia Mountaineers men's basketball
West Virginia